Munisport de Pointe-Noire is a Congolese football club based in Republic of the Congo. They play in the Congo Premier League.

Honours
Congo Premier League: 2
 1996, 1997.

Coupe du Congo: 1
 2004.

Super Coupe du Congo: 0

Performance in CAF competitions
CAF Confederation Cup: 1 appearance
2005 – Preliminary Round

Football clubs in the Republic of the Congo
Pointe-Noire